Edwin John Cumming Russell (1939–2013) was an English sculptor. He studied at the Brighton School of Art and the Royal Academy School. He was married to fellow sculptor Lorne McKean.

References

English sculptors
Modern sculptors
1939 births
2013 deaths